

National leagues

Primera División

Apertura champion: Peñarol (3rd title)
Top scorer: Juan Manuel Olivera (13 goals)
Clausura champion: Defensor Sporting (4th title)
Top scorer: Matías AlonsoLiber Quiñones (11 goals each)
Overall champion: Peñarol (47th title)
Top scorer: Juan Manuel Olivera (18 goals)
International qualifiers:
Copa Libertadores: 
Group Stage: Peñarol and Defensor Sporting
Preliminary Round: Nacional
Copa Sudamericana:
First Stage: Peñarol, River Plate, M. Wanderers and El Tanque Sisley
Relegated: Progreso, Bella Vista and Central Español

Segunda División

Segunda División champion: Sud América (7th title)
Play-off winner: Miramar Misiones
Promoted: Sud América, Rentistas and Miramar Misiones
Top scorer: Guillermo Maidana (16 goals)
Relegated: Huracán

Segunda División Amateur

Segunda División Amateur champion: Canadian
Promoted: Canadian (1st title)
Desafiliated: TBD

Clubs in international competitions

Cerro Largo
2012 Copa Sudamericana

Cerro Largo eliminated on points 1–4.

Danubio
2013 Copa Libertadores

Danubio eliminated on points 1–4.

Defensor Sporting
2013 Copa Libertadors
Defensor Sporting is already qualified for the 2012 Copa Libertadores.

Liverpool
2012 Copa Sudamericana

Liverpool eliminated on points 6–0.

Nacional
2012 Copa Sudamericana

Nacional eliminated on away goals.

2013 Copa Libertadors
Nacional is already qualified for the 2012 Copa Libertadores.

National teams

Senior team
This section covers Uruguay's senior team matches from the end of the 2012 Summer Olympics until the end of the 2013 FIFA Confederations Cup.

Friendly matches

World Cup qualifiers

Confederations Cup

Uruguay U-20

Friendly matches

World Cup qualifiers

Uruguay U-17

Friendly matches

Copa Backus

Limoge's International tournament

References

External links
AUF
Uruguay on FIFA.com

 
Seasons in Uruguayan football